Juliane Elander Rasmussen (born 17 February 1979, in Odder) is a Danish rower. She weighs 61 kilograms, and is therefore in the lightweight class. She lives in Copenhagen.

2008 Summer Olympics 
In the first race at the lightweight double sculls at Beijing, Rasmussen and team-mate Katrin Olsen were in third place behind Japan, but finished in second place, and qualified for the semi-final.  In the semi-final they came fourth (only the three best qualify for the final), and were eliminated. Their class was later won by The Netherlands.

2012 Summer Olympics 
At the 2012 Summer Olympics, Rasmussen and team-mate Anne Lolk Thomsen reached the final, which they finished in fourth place.

References 

1979 births
Living people
People from Odder Municipality
Olympic rowers of Denmark
Danish female rowers
Rowers at the 2004 Summer Olympics
Rowers at the 2008 Summer Olympics
Rowers at the 2012 Summer Olympics
Rowers at the 2016 Summer Olympics
World Rowing Championships medalists for Denmark
Sportspeople from the Central Denmark Region